SS Kielce was a Polish-operated cargo ship. She was a Type N3-S-A2 steamship, built in the United States in 1943 as SS Edgar Wakeman.

In 1946, while laden with a cargo of munitions, she sank in the English Channel after colliding with the British or French steamer Lombardy.

In 1967, an attempt to salvage her wreck inadvertently detonated some of her cargo, the resulting explosion was measured to be equivalent to a minor earthquake.

History
Pennsylvania Shipyards, Inc built Edgar Wakeman at Beaumont, Texas, and completed her in 1943. She was an oil-burning steamship, a variant of the Type N3 design built at the request of the UK Government.

In 1944, the US War Shipping Administration bareboat chartered her to the Polish government-in-exile, who renamed her after the city of Kielce in Małopolska. In April 1944, Kielce sailed in Convoy HK 217 from Galveston to Key West, Convoy KN 308 from Key West to New York, and Convoy HX 289 from New York to Liverpool. From then until April 1945, she took part in short-distance convoys in UK home waters.

On 5 March 1946, Kielce was in the English Channel off Folkestone, carrying a cargo of munitions from Southampton to Bremerhaven, when she collided with the steamer Lombardy. Fortunately, there were no casualties, and all crew members were rescued by Lombardy.

Explosion
In 1966, the Folkestone Salvage Company was contracted to clear the wreck, and disperse her explosive cargo. In 1967, the salvage company tried to dismantle part of the hull by setting explosive charges. On 22 July 1967, the third of these charges detonated some of her cargo. The resulting explosion damaged ceilings and chimneys, and dislodged roof slates in Folkestone. A few windows were broken when their frames shifted due to the blast. Despite the immense amount of force that was generated by the explosion, nobody was injured.

From their recordings, the explosion was estimated to have been about 4.5 on the Richter scale.

See also
  — WWII shipwreck in the Irish Sea containing explosives.
  — WWII shipwreck in the Thames Estuary containing explosives.
 List of accidents and incidents involving transport or storage of ammunition

References

1943 ships
Explosions in 1967
Maritime incidents in 1946
Ships built in Beaumont, Texas
World War II shipwrecks in the English Channel
Steamships of Poland
Type N3 ships
Ships sunk in collisions